Elena A. Panfilova is chairperson of the Center for Anti-corruption Research and Initiative Transparency International, the Russian chapter of Transparency International, and a director of Transparency International. She founded the chapter in 1999.

Panfilova was previously a professor in the School of Economics of the State University and is presently a professor in the graduate business school of Lomonosov Moscow State University. She lectures on business ethics and anti-corruption. Panfilova was also a lecturer on anti-corruption for the Council of Europe.

Her husband, Alexander Panfilov, is a translator.

References

External links 
Elena Panfilova speaking at Chatham House.
Interview with Elena Panfilova.

Living people
Academic staff of Moscow State University
Year of birth missing (living people)
Russian anti-corruption activists